Saroj Silpikul (born 27 December 1928) is a Thai former sports shooter. He competed in the 50 metre rifle, three positions and 50 metre rifle, prone events at the 1960 Summer Olympics.

References

External links
  

1928 births
Possibly living people
Saroj Silpikul
Saroj Silpikul
Shooters at the 1960 Summer Olympics
Saroj Silpikul
Asian Games medalists in shooting
Shooters at the 1958 Asian Games
Shooters at the 1962 Asian Games
Saroj Silpikul
Medalists at the 1962 Asian Games
Saroj Silpikul